In statistics, the Lepage test is an exactly distribution-free test (nonparametric test) for jointly monitoring the location (central tendency) and scale (variability) in two-sample treatment versus control comparisons. This is one of the most famous rank tests for the two-sample location-scale problem. The Lepage test statistic is the squared Euclidean distance of standardized Wilcoxon rank-sum test for location and the standardized Ansari–Bradley test for scale. The Lepage test was first introduced by Yves Lepage in 1971 in a paper in Biometrika.  A large number of Lepage-type tests exists in statistical literature for simultaneously testing location and scale shifts in case-control studies.  The details may be found in the book: Nonparametric statistical tests: A computational approach. Kössler, W. in 2006 also introduced various Lepage type tests using some alternative score functions optimal for various distributions. Dr. Amitava Mukherjee and Dr. Marco Marozzi introduced a class of percentile modified version of the Lepage test.  An alternative to the Lepage-type tests is known as the Cucconi test proposed by Odoardo Cucconi in 1968.

Conducting the Lepage test with R, an open-source software 
Practitioners can apply the Lepage test using the pLepage function of the contributory package NSM3, built under R software.  Andreas Schulz and Markus Neuhäuser also provided detailed R code for computation of test statistic and p-value of the Lepage test for the users.

Application in statistical process monitoring 
In recent years, Lepage statistic is widely used statistical process monitoring and quality control. In a classical development, in 2012, Amitava Mukherjee, an Indian statistician, and Subhabrata Chakraborti, an American statistician of Indian origin, introduced a distribution-free Shewhart-type Phase-II monitoring scheme (control chart) for simultaneously monitoring of location and scale parameter of a process using a test sample of fixed size, when a reference sample of sufficiently large size is available from an in-control population. Later in 2015, the same statisticians along with Shovan Chowdhury, proposed a distribution-free CUSUM-type Phase-II monitoring scheme based on the Lepage statistic. In 2017, Mukherjee further designed an EWMA-type distribution-free Phase-II monitoring scheme for joint monitoring of location and scale. In the same year, Mukherjee, with Marco Marozzi, an Italian statistician known for promoting the Cucconi test, came together to design Circular-Grid Lepage chart – a new type of joint monitoring scheme.

Multisample version of the Lepage test 
In 2005, František Rublìk introduced the multisample version of the original two-sample Lepage test. This work recently emerge as the motivation behind the proposal of the Phase-I distribution-free Shewhart-type control chart for joint monitoring of location and scale.

See also
 Cucconi test

References

Statistical tests
Nonparametric statistics